Spinipogon atrox is a species of moth of the family Tortricidae. It is found in Brazil in the states of Paraná and Minas Gerais.

References

Moths described in 1983
Cochylini